Sayyid Sajjad al-Radhawi (1919 – March 26, 1970) was a Pakistani-Iraqi Shia cleric and orator.

Biography 
al-Radhawi was born to Sayyid Muhammad-Mehdi bin Husayn bin Ali bin Ahmed bin Jawad bin Muhammad al-Radhawi in Lucknow, and shortly after migrated to Karbala along with his family. 

He began his religious education at a young age. He studied his advanced studies under Sheikh Ali Akbar al-Na'ini, Mirza Mahdi al-Shirazi, Sheikh Muhammad-Ali Sibuwayh, and others.

He loved delivering religious sermons, and ended up becoming one of Karbalas leading orators. He began travelling frequently to different Asian countries, such as Iran, Pakistan and India. He also travelled to Africa, where he gave sermons, and participated in Islamic ecumenical discussions in al-Azhar, Mogadishu, and Aden. However, he fell ill with asthma and a heart condition, that made it difficult for him to lecture and deliver sermons frequently.

Works 
al-Radhawi had authored a number of books including:

 Nuzhat al-Nathireen
 Al-A'maal wal-Ad'iya wal-Ziyarat
 Hayat Sayyid al-Battha' Abi Talib (Alayhi al-Salam). On the life of Abu Talib.

Personal life and death 
al-Radhawi eventually succumbed to his illnesses and died on Thursday, March 26, 1970, in Karbala, and was buried in the Imam Husayn shrine.

He was survived by his sons, Abbas, a cleric and orator, that passed away whilst giving a sermon on the pulpit in Kuwait, in 2008; and Husayn, who is married to the daughter of late Ayatollah, Sayyid Muhammad-Kadhim al-Modarresi. His daughter was married to the son of late scholar and orator, Sayyid Mustafa al-Faizi, from the Tumah family.

References

See also 
 Hussainiya
 Mirza Mahdi al-Shirazi

1919 births
1970 deaths
People from Karbala
Iraqi scholars
Iraqi people of Pakistani descent